Hlegu Township is a မြို့နယ် of Yangon Burma, Burma (Myanmar). It is northeast of the city Yangon and is largely rural.

The township's Paunglin Dam and Ngamoeyeik Reservoir supply water to over 28,300 hectares (70,000 acres) of farmland between Hlegu and Mingaladon, and nearly 340 million liters (90 million gallons) of water a day to the people living in Yangon.

The new Yangon-Naypyidaw Highway cuts through the township.

Borders
Hlegu township shares borders with Hmawbi Township and Taikkyi Township in the west, Bago Township of Bago Region in the north and east, North Okkalapa Township, North Dagon Township and East Dagon Township in the south.

Notes

External links
 "Hlegu Township, Yangon Division" map ID: MIMU154 Hlegu Township 090227 v01, 27 February 2009, Myanmar Information Management Unit (MIMU) 
 "Hlegu Google Satellite Map" Maplandia World Gazetteer

Townships of Yangon Region